Daniel M. Colla (born February 23, 1964) is a retired volleyball player from Argentina, who represented his native country in two Summer Olympics. After having finished in sixth place at the 1984 Summer Olympics in Los Angeles he was a member of the men's national team that claimed the bronze medal four years later in Seoul, South Korea.

External links

1964 births
Living people
Olympic volleyball players of Argentina
Volleyball players at the 1984 Summer Olympics
Volleyball players at the 1988 Summer Olympics
Olympic bronze medalists for Argentina
Place of birth missing (living people)
Olympic medalists in volleyball
Argentine men's volleyball players
Medalists at the 1988 Summer Olympics